Rosellas  are in a genus that consists of six species and nineteen subspecies. 
These colourful  parrots from Australia are in the genus Platycercus. 
Platycercus means "broad-tailed" or "flat-tailed", reflecting a feature common to the rosellas and other members of the broad-tailed parrot tribe. Their diet is mainly seeds and fruit.

Taxonomy
The genus was described by naturalist Nicholas Aylward Vigors in 1825; the name Platycercus derived from the Greek platykerkos meaning "broad-" or "flat-tailed", from platys "broad, wide, level, flat" and kerkos "tail of a beast". The relationships with other parrots have been unclear, with the Australian ringneck (genus Barnardius) cited as a closest relative by some, and the genus Psephotus by others; the plumage of the western rosella seen as a link to the latter genus.

Early European settlers encountered the eastern rosella at Rose Hill, New South Wales, now Parramatta, and so they called it the Rosehill parakeet which became "Rosehiller", and eventually "rosella".  Vigors defined the genus Platycercus in 1825, based on 
the distinctive architecture of the feathers in the tail and wing, and designated the crimson rosella Platycercus elegans (as Platycercus pennantii) as the type species. The description as a flat or broad tail follows Heinrich Kuhl, who separated his psittacine specimens to a group with tails that were "narrow and cuneated", that is, a tapering wedged outline.

There are, broadly speaking, three groups of rosella species. They are the blue-cheeked species which includes elegans and caledonicus, the white-cheeked species, eximius, adscitus and venustus and the yellow-cheeked species, icterotis. The observed difference in plumage has been reinforced by molecular studies in 1987 and 2015 that place the icterotis as a basal offshoot.

There are six species and many subspecies: Ovenden and colleagues analysed mitochondrial DNA, confirming the blue-cheeked and white-cheeked lineages. They found P. caledonicus to be basal to the other blue-cheeked forms, with P. elegans nigrescens being divergent from other subspecies of P. elegans. Also, P. venustus was basal to P. eximius and P. adscitus. However, a mitochondrial study published in 2017 found that P. eximius was the earlier offshoot of the lineage that split into P. adscitus and P. venustus, and that nonsister taxa were hence able to hybridise. In 2015, Ashlee Shipham and colleagues published a molecular study based on nuclear DNA finding that P. venustus and P. adscitus were sister species, and that P. elegans nigrescens diverged earlier than P. caledonicus.

Platycercus, Vigors 1825

 Platycercus caledonicus, (Gmelin 1788)
 Platycercus caledonicus brownii, (Kuhl 1820)
 Platycercus caledonicus caledonicus, (Gmelin 1788)
 Platycercus elegans, (Gmelin 1788)
 Platycercus elegans elegans, (Gmelin 1788)
 Platycercus elegans flaveolus, Gould 1837
 Platycercus elegans fleurieuensis, Ashby 1917
 Platycercus elegans melanopterus, North 1906
 Platycercus elegans nigrescens, Ramsay, EP 1888
 Platycercus elegans subadelaidae, Mathews 1912
 Platycercus elegans adeleidae, Gould, 1841
 Platycercus elegans filewoodi, McAllan & Bruce, 1989
 Platycercus venustus, (Kuhl 1820)
 Platycercus venustus hilli, Mathews 1910
 Platycercus venustus venustus, (Kuhl 1820)
 Platycercus adscitus, (Latham 1790)
 Platycercus adscitus adscitus, (Latham 1790)
 Platycercus adscitus palliceps, Lear 1832
 Platycercus eximius, (Shaw 1792)
 Platycercus eximius diemenensis, North 1911
 Platycercus eximius elecica, Schodde & Short 1989
 Platycercus eximius eximius, (Shaw 1792)
 Platycercus icterotis, (Temminck & Kuhl 1820)
 Platycercus icterotis icterotis, (Temminck & Kuhl 1820)
 Platycercus icterotis xanthogenys, Salvadori 1891

Description
The feathers on their backs show an obvious scalloping appearance with colouring that differs between the species. All species have distinctive cheek patches. Sexual dimorphism is absent or slight – males and females generally have similar plumage, apart from the western rosella. The juveniles of the blue-cheeked species, and western rosella, all have a distinctive green-based plumage, while immature plumage of the white-cheeked species is merely a duller version of the adults.

Distribution and habitat
Rosellas are native to Australia and nearby islands, where they inhabit forests, woodlands, farmlands, and suburban parks and gardens. They are confined to the coastal mountains and plains and are absent from the outback. Introduced populations have also established themselves in New Zealand (notably in the North Island and in north Dunedin) and on Norfolk Island.

Behaviour and ecology
Rosellas feed predominantly on seeds and fruit, with food held in the foot. They enjoy bathing in puddles of water in the wild and in captivity. Rosellas scratch their heads with the foot behind the wing.

Mutual preening is not exhibited by the genus, and the courtship display is simple; the male waves his tail sideways, and engages in some head bobbing, and the female reciprocates.

Like most parrots, they are cavity nesters, generally nesting high in older large trees in forested areas. They generally have a clutch size of several eggs which are incubated for around 21 days by the female alone. The male feeds the female through this time and for some time after incubation concludes. Quickly covered in a white down, chicks take around five weeks to fledge.

Aviculture
The more colourful rosella species are popular as pet parrots and also as aviary birds. They can live for longer than 20 years, and they are relatively easy to breed. All have a reputation for being aggressive in captivity, and are hence recommended be kept separate from other caged birds. Their diet in aviculture includes seeds, fruit such as apple, pear, and grapes, and vegetable matter such as lettuce, grass, and silver beet.

References

Cited texts

External Links

Platycercus